SN 1917A is a supernova event in the Fireworks Galaxy (NGC 6946), positioned  west and  south of the galactic core. Discovered by American optician George Willis Ritchey on 19 July 1917, it reached a peak visual magnitude of 13.6. Based on a poor quality 
photographic spectrum taken at least a month after peak light by F. G. Pease and Ritchey, it was identified as a type II core-collapse supernova.

A 2018 analysis of the surrounding stellar population by B. F. Williams suggests the progenitor star was most likely 13 million years old with 15 times the mass of the Sun. A 2020 search for light echoes from the supernova was unsuccessful.

References

Supernovae
19170919
Cepheus (constellation)